Kjetil Undset (born 24 August 1970) is a Norwegian competition rower and Olympic medalist.

He received a silver medal in quadruple sculls at the 1992 Summer Olympics in Barcelona.

He received a silver medal in double sculls at the 1996 Summer Olympics in Atlanta, together with Steffen Størseth.

References

1970 births
Living people
Norwegian male rowers
Olympic rowers of Norway
Olympic silver medalists for Norway
Rowers at the 1992 Summer Olympics
Rowers at the 1996 Summer Olympics
Rowers at the 2000 Summer Olympics
Olympic medalists in rowing
Medalists at the 1996 Summer Olympics
Medalists at the 1992 Summer Olympics
World Rowing Championships medalists for Norway